Instapoetry is a style of written poetry that emerged after the advent of social media. Instapoetry is a term that can be used to describe poems written specifically for being shared online, most commonly on Instagram (but also other platforms including Twitter, Tumblr, and TikTok). 

Such form usually consists of short, direct lines in aesthetically pleasing fonts that are sometimes accompanied by an image or drawing, with or without a rhyme scheme.

Literary scholars and writers have contended with Instapoetry's focus on brevity and authenticity compared to other poetic styles. While some have lauded Instapoetry's accessibility and political themes, others have criticized it reproducing rather than subverting normative ideas on social media platforms that favor popularity over depth of content.

History  
Instapoetry developed as a result of poets trying to share their work in order to expand their readership. Writers of this "sub-genre" began using social media as their preferred method of distribution rather than traditional publishing methods. The term "instapoetry" was created by other writers trying to define and understand the new extension of instant poetry shared via social media, most prominently Instagram.

In its most basic form, Instapoetry usually consists of byte-sized verses that consider political and social subjects such as immigration, domestic violence, sexual assault, love, culture, feminism, gun violence, war, racism, LGBTQ rights, and other social justice topics. All of these elements are usually made to fit social media feeds that are easily accessible through applications on smartphones.

Scholarship 
Despite the diversity of poetry on Instagram, the Brazilian linguist Bruna Osaki Fazano found that shared "aspects of the compositional form, theme and style" mean that it can be understood as a specific genre. Writing in Poetics Today, JuEunhae Knox combined quantiative and qualitative analysis to show that Instapoetry is a cohesive genre, in part because "the sheer volume and rapidity of content production in turn encourages posts that are not only visually appealing but also immediately recognizable as Instapoems". 

Although media often presents Instapoetry as anti-establishment, Alyson Miller found that the content was often conservative, and that there is "a persistent disjuncture between the extra-textual commentary surrounding Instapoetry, particularly by way of interviews and artistic statements, and the content of works which repeatedly reinscribe conservative, patriarchal, and heteronormative worldviews".

Instapoetry is a new poetic practice that serves as a form of self-staging for poets and "[crafts] authenticity". Eirik Vassenden describes the work of Norwegian poet Trygve Skaug as appearing to offer a "simple, almost direct access to the inner self". Vassenden writes that poems such as Rupi Kaur's "if you are not enough for yourself / you will never be enough / for someone else" are "authentic" to such an extent that they are not literary.

Scholars have also studied the work of specific Instapoets, such as Rupi Kaur, R.M. Drake, Aja Monet, Yrsa Daley-Ward, Nayyirah Waheed, Atticus, Nikita Gill and Trygve Skaug.

Supporters 
Despite challenging the structure of traditional poetry, supporters argue that while a reader can easily dismiss the simplicity of the style, Instapoetry provides a modern take on traditional poetic principles. They argue that many works by writers in the literary canon were once criticized for deviating from the standards of their time. While Instapoets may be looked down upon by those in academia, these writers have opened a door to poetry in a way that traditional education has failed to do. Some academics appreciate the way in which it has stimulated interest in poetry.

Instapoetry has inspired record high poetry readership around the world. This is because Instapoetry remains one of the most accessible forms of poetry. The lines are usually clear, to the point, and short; emotionally intense and vulnerable; not hidden underneath layers of metaphor or verbose language. According to Huma Qureshi, writer at The Guardian, Instapoetry is instantly relatable to almost everyone who reads it due to the manner in which the poems are designed and posted online. Additionally, Instagram allows users to add a caption to the images they post. This feature is frequently used by Instapoets to explain the piece's meaning and derivation. The caption is also the space where users add hashtags to their post that categorize their poems as #nature or #mental health. Most Instapoets carefully employ hashtags in the hopes of obtaining the biggest possible readership.

Instapoems also lure readers in with their low-commitment experience, according to critic Elizabeth Brueggemann. For example, to figure out what an instapoem's meaning is, readers do not need to think critically about the strong metaphors or other such concepts. Instead, instapoems encourage the readers to critique the institutions, organizations and communities that oppress certain sections of the population.

Instapoetry has been a social space for feminist communities. Female empowerment, sisterhood, rape, trauma, female experience and sexuality are some of the common themes that are dominant in #instapoetry. For example, Rupi Kaur’s immigrant-themed work attracted women of color looking for representation. Following these poets on social media sites such as Instagram enable different groups to self-define themselves and relate to the specific viewpoints or political ideologies of the instapoet.

Criticism 
Many critics argue that since Instapoets avoid critical evaluations, academics, and the publishing industry, Instapoets should just be viewed as online celebrities rather than literary figures.

Some critics view this style of poetry as a disgrace to "real" poetry. Vinu Caspar reflects on the ways Instapoetry has turned poetry into a "capitalist" endeavor, and  believes that the words are emotionless and written only to attract followers. The rate at which these Instapoets produce new material, he argues, steals from "[p]oets who spend years honing their craft, carefully writing and rewriting every line, practicing their performance over and over...". The feeling is that instapoetry is a collection of words with little-to-no meaning, "under the guise of poetry."

Similarly, Thom Young, a poet and high school English teacher, created a parody Instagram page as a way to mock Instapoets and their work. He states, "the younger generation is mostly interested in fidget-spinner poetry. Like they're just scrolling on their devices, to read something instantly, while the libraries are empty. I think people today don't want to read anything that causes a whole lot of critical thinking." The page was created to show how effortlessly anyone can become an Instapoet, and to display the lack of difficulty in writing this form of poetry.

Social media platforms, on the other hand, may also kill the creativity that inspired such poetry in the first place. According to Johnathan Ford's piece in the Financial Times, Instagram's algorithms are limiting prospective Instapoets' reach-per-post, pushing them to pay to promote their material. The most popular Instagram accounts — the ones with the most likes and follows — will be promoted to the front of users' feeds. This algorithm theoretically favors the spread of bland, inauthentic, or clichéd content while preventing genuine creative thinking from reaching its intended audience.

Instapoets 

Rupi Kaur
Atticus
Amanda Lovelace
Tyler Knott Gregson
Najwa Zebian
Lang Leav
Nikita Gill
Samantha Hutson
Fred T. Williams
Winnie Nantongo

Trygve Skaug

References

External links
Meet Rupi Kaur, Queen of the ‘Instapoets’, Rolling Stone (magazine) (December 2017)
NidaMahmoed - Instaquotes: give peace a chance, Vogue Mexico Vogue México y Latinoamérica (July 2016)

Genres of poetry
Social media

Electronic literature